The fourth and final season of The Fugitive was filmed in color, and was originally aired Tuesdays at 10:00-11:00 pm on ABC from September 13, 1966, to August 29, 1967. The season was released through two volumes on Region 1 DVDs, with Volume 1 (containing the first 15 episodes) released on November 2, 2010, and Volume 2 released on February 15, 2011.

At the time of its initial airing, "The Judgment: Part 2" was the highest-rated episode of a TV series until the record was surpassed by the Dallas episode "Who Done It" thirteen years later. This same episode also surpassed the national viewership record set by the historic first appearance of the Beatles on The Ed Sullivan Show three years earlier, with an estimated 78 million viewers. This was then broken by the Roots episode "Part VIII" in 1977.

Episodes

References

The Fugitive (TV series) seasons